K. Hariharan may refer to:

 K. Hariharan (director), Indian film director
 Krishna Hariharan (born 1955), Indian Test cricket umpire